The 1936 Texas Tech Matadors football team represented Texas Technological College—now known as Texas Tech University—as a member of the Border Conference during the 1936 college football season. Led by seventh-year head coach, the Matadors compiled an overall record of 5–4–1 with a mark of 0–0–1 in conference play, tying for fourth place in the Border Conference. The team played home games at Tech Field in Lubbock, Texas.

Schedule

References

Texas Tech
Texas Tech Red Raiders football seasons
Texas Tech Matadors football